Haccou or Haccoû is a surname. Notable people with the surname include:
 Johannes Cornelis Haccou (1798 - 1839), Dutch painter
 Jacobus Franciscus Haccoû (1903 - 1972), Dutch economist
 Patricia Haccou (born 1957), Dutch mathematician
 Tobias Haccou (born 1999), Dutch ISSF athlete